Emily Cheney Neville (December 28, 1919 – December 14, 1997) was an American author.  She was born in Manchester, Connecticut and graduated from Bryn Mawr College in 1940.  She then worked for the New York Daily News and the New York Daily Mirror newspapers.

She had five children with her husband, Glenn Neville, a newspaperman, and lived in New York City. Her first book, It's Like This, Cat (1963), won the Newbery Medal in 1964. Her other works include:  Berries Goodman (1965); The Seventeen-Street Gang (1966); Traveler From a Small Kingdom (1968); and Fogarty (1969).

"Her books have been praised by critics for their emphasis on realism and honest depiction of adolescent life," especially urban life.

References

External links

 
 
 
 Emily Cheney Neville at Library of Congress Authorities — with 11 catalog records

 

1919 births
1997 deaths
American children's writers
Newbery Medal winners
Bryn Mawr College alumni
People from Manchester, Connecticut
20th-century American women writers